Det perfekte mord, also known as Det perfekte mord – Homo Falsus, is a 1992 Norwegian thriller film directed by Eva Isaksen, starring Gard B. Eidsvold, Anna-Lena Hemström and Anne Marit Jacobsen. It is based on the novel Homo Falsus by Jan Kjærstad.

Film-maker Pierre (Eidsvold) is shooting an erotic thriller with his girlfriend Greta (Hemström). Soon the story begins to repeat itself in real life.

External links
 
 

1992 films
1992 thriller films
1990s erotic thriller films
Films based on Norwegian novels
Norwegian thriller films